Arasarkulam Thenpathi  is a village in the Aranthangirevenue block of Pudukkottai district, Tamil Nadu, India.

Demographics 
Arasar Kulam has been divided into VadaPadhi (North Quadrant), ThenPadhi (South Quadrant), Keelpadhi (East Quadrant/Quarter) and Melpathi (West Quarter/Quadrant). VadaPadhi & KeelPadhi has been mostly occupied by Hindu brothers. ThenPadhi and Melpadhi has been occupied by Muslims and Hindus.
As per the 2001 census, Arasarkulam Thenpathi had a total population of  5233 with 1920 males and 2435 females. Out of the total population 2798 people were literate. Now Arasarkulam is well developing area in aranthangi block.

References

Villages in Pudukkottai district

nature place peacefull places good peoples and muslim hindus are friends and families